Alastair Riddle (born 7 June 1941) is a Scottish former footballer who played as a winger. Beginning his career in 1959 with Montrose, Riddle was transferred to Dundee United in 1962 but made just four appearances for the club, returning to Montrose shortly after. Riddle spent four years at Montrose during his second spell before retiring at the end of the 1966-67 season.

After retiring, Riddle – who never played full-time – worked as an electrical engineer before running his own television business. He is now retired.

External links 
 Montrose FC profile

Living people
Scottish footballers
Scottish Football League players
Montrose F.C. players
Dundee United F.C. players
1941 births
Association football midfielders